Deloneura barca is a butterfly in the family Lycaenidae. It is found in Angola.

References

External links

Die Gross-Schmetterlinge der Erde 13: Die Afrikanischen Tagfalter. Plate XIII 65 c

Endemic fauna of Angola
Butterflies described in 1901
Deloneura